Escadrille 26 is a squadron of the French Air Force founded in 1914 and still active today.

History
Escadrille 26 was founded on 26 August 1914, at Arras. It was originally equipped with Morane-Saulnier aircraft, leading to its designation as Escadrille MS26. It went into action attached to VI Armée of the French ground forces until 24 September 1914; it then switched bases to the Kingdom of Belgium.

During 1915, it re-armed with Nieuport 11s, and became Escadrille N26. In June 1916, it moved to Cachy to join an improvised formation, Groupe de Combat de la Somme. This groupe initially consisted of three other units in addition to Escadrille N26—Escadrille N3, Escadrille N103, and Escadrille N73 and became the famous Fighter Squadron Storks (Escadrille des Cigognes) . Command of the groupe was granted to Capitaine Antonin Brocard. On 1 November 1916, the groupe was formalized as Groupe de Combat 12, Brocard commanding.

On 16 April 1917, GC 12 switched from VIII Armée'''s theater of operations to that of X Armée and VII Armée; they were then involved in the Second Battle of the Aisne. During July 1917, the escadrille moved to Flanders to aid 1er Armée. On 11 December 1917, it would return to VII Armée. As the year ended, the escadrille restocked with SPADs, becoming Escadrille SPA 26.

In January 1918, SPA 26 was posted to IV Armée. It moved to VI Armée in March, and X Armée in June. It began July 1918 with V Armée, and moved to 1er Armée on the 29th. On 18 September 1918, the escadrille was posted back to IV Armée, and remained there until war's end.

On 12 January 1919, Escadrille SPA 26 was cited by IV Armée for the destruction of 51 enemy aircraft and the disability of 70 more.Escadrille SPA 26 is still current in today's French Air Force.

Commanding officers
 Capitaine Robert Jannerod: 26 August 1914 - January 1915
 Capitaine Pierre de Malherbe: January 1915 - November 1915
 Capitaine Thobie: mid-November 1915
 Capitaine Jacques de Sieyes de Veynes: 17 May 1916 - POW 3 July 1916
 Capitaine Victor Menard: July 1916 - April 1917
 Capitaine Mathieu Tenant de la Tour: April 1917 - Killed in flying accident 17 December 1917
 Capitaine Joseph M. X. de Sévin: 25 December 1917 - end of war

Notable personnel
 Lieutenant Roland Garros
 Lieutenant Marcel Bernard
 Major general Joseph M. X. de Sévin
 Sous lieutenant Noël de Rochefort
 Adjutant Gustave Naudin
 Maréchal-des-logis Constant Soulier

Aircraft
 Morane-Saulnier: 26 August 1914
 Nieuport 11: 1915
 Nieuport 17 SPADEndnotes

 References 
 Franks, Norman; Frank W. Bailey. Over the Front: A Complete Record of the Fighter Aces and Units of the United States and French Air Services, 1914-1918 Grub Street, 1992. , .

 Further reading 
 Bailey, Frank W., and Christophe Cony. French Air Service War Chronology, 1914-1918: Day-to-Day Claims and Losses by French Fighter, Bomber and Two-Seat Pilots on the Western Front. London: Grub Street, 2001.
 Davilla, James J., and Arthur M. Soltan. French Aircraft of the First World War. Stratford, CT: Flying Machines Press, 1997.
 Les escadrilles de l'aéronautique militaire française: symbolique et histoire, 1912-1920''. Vincennes: Service historique de l'armée de l'air, 2004.

External links
 Escadrille MS26 - N 26 - SPA 26

French Air and Space Force squadrons